Class of 1965 Arena is a 2,222-seat multi-purpose arena in Hamilton, New York. It opened to the Colgate University Raiders men's and women's ice hockey teams on October 1, 2016, replacing Starr Arena which had been in service since 1959.  The ice rink is named the Steven J. Riggs '65 Rink, in honor of Steven Riggs, one of Colgate's best hockey players in the program's history, who was killed in action on September 3, 1968, in Quy Thien, Vietnam. The facility was built partly with the aid of 559 donors, a significant number of whom represented the Colgate Class of 1965.  The facility cost $37.8 million.

References

Sports venues in New York (state)
College ice hockey venues in the United States
Indoor ice hockey venues in the United States
Colgate Raiders ice hockey
Sports venues in Madison County, New York
2016 establishments in New York (state)
Sports venues completed in 2016